Lena Hilda Zavaroni (4 November 1963 – 1 October 1999) was a Scottish singer and a television show host.  At ten years of age, with her album Ma! (He's Making Eyes at Me), she was the youngest person in history to have an album in the top ten of the UK Albums Chart. Later she starred in her own television series, made numerous TV guest star appearances, and appeared on stage. From the age of thirteen, Zavaroni suffered anorexia nervosa and also developed clinical depression when she was fifteen. Following an operation to cure her depression, Zavaroni died at the age of thirty-five from pneumonia on 1 October 1999.

Life and career

Early life

Zavaroni was born in Greenock, Renfrewshire and grew up in the small town of Rothesay on the Isle of Bute.  Her parents owned a fish and chip shop. Her father Victor (b. 1939) played the guitar and her mother, Hilda (née Jordan) (c. 1940 – 1989) sang. Zavaroni began singing at age two. Her grandfather Alfredo had emigrated from Italy.

Zavaroni was discovered in the summer of 1973 by record producer Tommy Scott, who was on holiday in Rothesay and heard her singing in a band with her father and uncle. Scott contacted impresario Phil Solomon, which led to his partner Dorothy Solomon becoming Zavaroni's manager.

Musical career

In 1974, Zavaroni appeared on Opportunity Knocks hosted by Hughie Green and won the show for a record-breaking five weeks running. She followed this with the album Ma! (He's Making Eyes At Me), a collection of classic and then-recent pop standards which reached number eight in the UK album chart. At 10 years, 146 days old, Zavaroni remains the youngest person to have an album in the Top 10.

Zavaroni sang at a Hollywood charity show with Frank Sinatra and Lucille Ball in 1974, at which Ball commented: "You’re special. Very special and very, very good", although some sources attribute the words to Sinatra. Following this, Zavaroni guest-starred on The Carol Burnett Show, and on June 4th 1974, The Tonight Show. She also appeared on The Morecambe and Wise Show, the May 29th 1975 episode of  The Wheeltappers and Shunters Social Club, in the 1976 Royal Variety Show and performed at the White House for US President Gerald Ford. Signed to the soul-oriented Stax Records label in the United States, Zavaroni was not especially successful in America, despite the praise and television appearances; her Ma album did not enter the charts, and its title single only reached 91st position on the Billboard Hot 100 during a four-week chart run in the summer of 1974.

Stage and television career
While attending London's Italia Conti Academy stage school, Zavaroni met and became long-term friends with another young star Bonnie Langford. They starred in the ITV special Lena and Bonnie. In September 1978, the BBC broadcast Lena Zavaroni on Broadway.

In 1979, Zavaroni had her own TV series on the BBC called Lena Zavaroni and Music, and from 1980 to 1982 she had a TV series, Lena.

Later years
From the age of 13, Zavaroni suffered from anorexia nervosa. While she was at stage school, her weight dropped to 4 stone (25 kg, 56 lbs). She blamed this on the pressure placed upon her to fit into costumes while at the same time "developing as a woman". She continued to have anorexia throughout the 1980s.

In 1989, Zavaroni married computer consultant Peter Wiltshire. The couple settled in north London but separated 18 months later. Also in 1989, Zavaroni's mother, Hilda, died of a tranquilliser overdose and a fire destroyed all of her show business mementos.

After the breakup of her marriage, Zavaroni moved to Hoddesdon, Hertfordshire, to be nearer to her father and his second wife. By this time, she was living on state benefits and in 1999 was accused of stealing a 50p packet of jelly, although the charges were later dropped.

Health issues and death

Zavaroni underwent drug treatments and received electroconvulsive therapy in an attempt to end her depression. She begged doctors to operate on her to relieve her depression. Although the operation would not cure her anorexia, she was desperate for it to proceed and threatened suicide if it did not (she also took a drug overdose).

In September 1999, Zavaroni was admitted to University Hospital of Wales in Cardiff for the psychosurgical operation. It took place on 7 September and was described as "pioneering". After the operation, she appeared to be in satisfactory condition and after a week she was "making telephone calls, cheerful and engaging in conversation", even asking her doctor if he thought there was any chance that she would get back on stage and sing again.

Although some reports said that the surgery was a lobotomy (also known as a leucotomy), the hospital said that it was not, and the treatment was intended for depression rather than anorexia as was rumoured at the time.

Her funeral took place at the Roman Catholic Church of St Augustine in Hoddesdon, on 15 October 1999 and she was buried later that day at Hoddesdon Cemetery in Hertfordshire.

Discography

Albums
Ma! (He's Making Eyes At Me)
If My Friends Could See Me Now
Presenting Lena Zavaroni
Songs Are Such Good Things
Lena Zavaroni And Her Music
Hold Tight, It's Lena

Compilations and live albums
The Lena Zavaroni Collection – Pickwick released a two record set in 1976, made up of Lena's first two albums.
Lena Zavaroni in South Africa

Singles

References

External links

 
 
 Lena Zavaroni at British Film Institute

1963 births
1999 deaths
Deaths from pneumonia in Wales
Alumni of the Italia Conti Academy of Theatre Arts
Italian British musicians
People from Greenock
People from Rothesay, Bute
20th-century Scottish women singers
Scottish child singers
Scottish people of Italian descent
Stax Records artists
Mezzo-sopranos